Michal Feldman (born 1 February 1976) is a full professor of Computer Science and the Chair of Computation and Economics at Tel Aviv University, the head of Economics and Computation (EC) lab, and a visiting researcher in Microsoft Research Israel. Michal’s research focuses on algorithmic game theory, an area that lies in the intersection of computer science, microeconomics and game theory. Among other topics, she studies auction theory, mechanism design, algorithm design, the price of anarchy, and e-commerce. Michal is an alumna of the Israel Young Academy and of the Global Young Academy. Her research is funded by prestigious grants, including, among others, grants of the ERC (European Research Council) : ERC starters and ERC consolidator, ISF grants (Israel Science foundation), and an Amazon Research Award. She was selected by the Forbes magazine as one of the most influencing women in Israel in 2016. , and was recently awarded the Kadar Award for Outstanding Research.

Biography
Michal was born to Tzipi and Dr. Menachem Finkelstein. Michal is married to Yuval Feldman, a law professor at Bar-Ilan University, and they have five children. Upon graduating high school, Michal served in the intelligence unit. In 1999, she received her BSc in computer science from Bar Ilan University summa cum laude. In 2005, she completed her PhD studies in the University of California, Berkeley. In her PhD thesis, she studied incentives for collaboration in peer-to-peer systems. Her PhD dissertations included several breakthroughs in the area of cooperation in peer-to-peer systems, and paved the way for a fruitful research area. Upon graduation, Feldman returned to Israel and continued her postdoctoral studies at the Hebrew University of Jerusalem, under the supervision of Prof. Noam Nisan.
In 2007, she joined as a faculty member to the Jerusalem School of Business Administration, and as a member of the Center for the Study of Rationality. From 2011 to 2013, Feldman was a visiting professor at Harvard University in Cambridge, Massachusetts, and a visiting researcher in Microsoft Research New England. In 2011, Feldman was elected to the Global Young Academy, and in 2012, she was elected to the Israel Young Academy, established by the National Academy of Sciences and Humanities. In 2013, upon her return to Israel, Feldman joined the School of Computer Science at Tel Aviv University.

Honors and awards
•   Kadar Award for Outstanding Research (2022)

•	The Alon Scholarship for outstanding researchers, by the Israeli Council for Higher Education (2009).
	
•	Two ERC grants, of the European Research Council (2013 - starter, 2019 – consolidator).
 
•	Marie Curie IOF fellowship, of the European Commission (2011) 

•	Amazon Research Award (2018).

•	Tel Aviv University Rector award for excellence in teaching (2016).

•	Member of the Israel Young Academy, and a member of its management committee (2012-2016).

•	Member of the Global Young Academy (2011-2015).

•	TheMarker Magazine's 40 under 40 (most promising young men and women under the age of 40) (2014).

•	Forbes magazine list of 50 most influential women in Israel (2016).

References

External links 
•	Michal Feldman's list of publications on dblp.

•	

•	Michal Feldman's home page, Tel Aviv University.

•	The Economics and Computation (EC) Lab homepage.

•	Forbes list of 50 most influential women in Israel (2016).

1976 births
Living people
Israeli women computer scientists
Israeli computer scientists
Bar-Ilan University alumni
University of California, Berkeley alumni
Academic staff of the Hebrew University of Jerusalem
Academic staff of Tel Aviv University